The Cathedral Bridge was a railway and street bridge crossing the river Rhine in the German city of Cologne. It was owned by the Cologne-Minden Railway Company and named after the Cologne Cathedral, which is located on the same longitudinal axis. It was built in combination with the original Central Station and a new ground-level railway track through the north Altstadt of the Cologne Innenstadt. As the Cathedral Bridge could not bolster the increased traffic of the new Köln Hauptbahnhof in 1894, it was replaced by the Hohenzollern Bridge in 1911.

History and construction 

The Prussian authorities pressed for a bridge due to increasing road traffic between Cologne and the eastern river bank. Before the Cathedral Bridge, passengers and goods had to be transported across the river by reaction ferry or pontoon bridge. The city council filed a request with Frederick William IV of Prussia in 1847, who through the Ministry of Trade, Commerce and Public Works appointed the Prussian chief civil engineer Karl Lentze to design the bridge.

The initial drawings of the bridge allowed only one horse-drawn carriage to cross the bridge. On the western bank, the road was led in northeastern direction past the Cologne Cathedral. It might, however, be mentioned that the Britannia Bridge successfully took increasingly heavy railway trains across the Menai Strait from its opening in 1850 until it was seriously damaged by fire in 1970.

The wrought iron latticework of the Cathedral Bridge was designed by hydraulic engineer Hermann Lohse and formed an intricate network of diagonal lattices both on the inside and outside of the bridge. The bridge's gates, erected out of gray Udelfanger sandstone and holding heavy iron doors to close either side of the bridge, were designed by Heinrich Strack and added after the bridge had been completed. The combination of a cage-like structure that could be closed on either side inspired the local nickname "mouse trap". The bridge was also referred to as solid bridge, because it was the first immovable bridge in between Basel and the Netherlands since the Roman bridge, built near Cologne in the 4th century. Since the Middle Ages, reaction ferries formed flying bridges and since Prussian times, ship's bridges, a form of pontoon bridges, were also used.

The earthworks started on 6 June 1855; the foundation stone was laid by Frederick William IV four months later, on 3 October. Only after construction work had begun were the designs altered to include dual railway tracks on the northern downstream side of the bridge. Since the early 1850s, the Prussian authorities emphasized on constructing state railways. This opened up the possibility for the Cologne-Minden Railway Company to co-finance the bridge to extend the Deutz–Gießen line into the heart of Cologne, and integrate the previously separate railways on either side of the river Rhine. At the request of the Prussian Army, who had to approve every bridge design before it was carried out, it included a swing bridge on the western side which could be closed in case of war. The design was inspired by the railway bridges over the river Vistula at Tczew and over the river Nogat at Malbork, both of which were finished in 1857 as part of the Prussian Eastern Railway. The same chief superintendent for those bridges, Hermann Lohse, also led the construction work for the Cathedral Bridge.

The Cathedral Bridge was inaugurated on 3 October 1859, exactly four years after construction work had officially begun. Forty years after the construction, it was estimated the bridge had cost nearly 4 million (Prussian) Thalers.

Deconstruction 
The bridge was unable to meet the increased requirements imposed on it by the new Cologne Central Station (1894). After the construction work had already started for the Hohenzollern Bridge in 1907, the Cathedral Bridge was deconstructed in stages between 1908 and 1910. The Hohenzollern Bridge was completed 1911, demolished in 1945 during World War II and subsequently rebuilt. The current Hohenzollern Bridge's southern foundation is placed at nearly exactly the same place of the Cathedral Bridge's foundation and is the most heavily used railway bridge in Germany.

References 

Buildings and structures in Cologne
Bridges completed in 1859
Bridges over the Rhine
Demolished bridges
History of Cologne
Innenstadt, Cologne
Railway bridges in Germany
Truss bridges
Former railway bridges in Germany
Wrought iron bridges
Bridges in North Rhine-Westphalia